The Cossack raid on Istanbul (Constantinople) of 1615 was an attack on Istanbul by the Zaporozhian Cossacks, led by Hetman Petro Konashevych-Sahaidachny. Cossacks attacked the harbor of the city and burned it before returning to Ukraine. The success of this raid inspired the Tutora campaign of 1620 and the Khotyn campaign of 1621.

Background 
The Cossack communities emerged in the fourteenth century in the Ukrainian steppe by the Dnieper River. The Cossacks developed highly militaristic communities largely responsible for raids on Tatars. Neighboring states, including the Kingdom of Poland, employed them in times of conflict. In the 1500s, the Cossacks frequently attacked the Crimean Tatars and Ottomans with the intention of plundering treasure and liberating Christian slaves. By the sixteenth and seventeenth centuries, the Cossacks began raiding communities in the Black Sea, including the cities of Varna, Perekop, Bilhorod, Izmail, and Trebizond.

Raid 

In May 1615, a group of Cossacks embarked to Turkey on eighty small boats, each one carrying approximately 50 men. By mid-June they crossed the Black Sea and landed in the vicinity of Constantinople. The Cossacks captured and set on fire the Istanbul neighborhood of Scutari (now Üsküdar), as well as the ports of Mizevna and Archioca. After raiding the city, the Cossacks returned to Ukraine.

Sultan Ahmed I, noticing smoke from his windows caused by the fire, sent a fleet of galleys in pursuit. The Ottomans caught up with the Cossacks at the mouth of the Danube. However the Cossacks defeated them and the admiral of the fleet was captured.

Aftermath 

The raid strengthened the morale of the Cossacks, who were now successfully attacking strongholds which neither the Holy Roman Empire nor the Polish–Lithuanian Commonwealth dared to attack. European diplomats brought news of the Cossack raid to the West. French historian Michel Baudier wrote: "The only mention of the Cossacks brings dread and terror to Constantinople".

As retribution, Ahmed I sent a fleet under the command of Admiral Ali-Pasha the following year with the intention of raiding the Cossacks at Dnieper. They were met by chaikas under the command of Konashevich-Sagaidachny. The Cossacks again defeated the Ottomans, seizing a dozen galleys and nearly a hundred boats. Ali-Pasha narrowly escaped.

The Cossacks subsequently blockaded the Crimean Peninsula and launched an attack on Kaffa, which was at the time one of the most important Turkish ports on the Black Sea and a center of their slave trade.

See also
 Cossack raid on Istanbul (1620)
 Cossack raids on Istanbul (1624)

Sources 
1. Крип'якевич І., Гнатевич Б. та ін. Історія українського війська. – Львів, 1992. – С.193-194
2. "Cossack Navy 16th - 17th Centuries". geocities. Archived from the original on 26 October 2009.

References

Conflicts in 1615
17th century in Istanbul
17th century in the Zaporozhian Host
1615 in the Ottoman Empire
Military history of Turkey
Military history of Ukraine
Cossack raids on the Ottoman Empire